HBSE may refer to:
Harris Blitzer Sports & Entertainment, American holding company
Haryana Board of School Education, school board serving the Indian state of Haryana